The Women's Scratch is one of the 7 women's events at the 2007 UCI Track World Championship, held in Palma de Mallorca, Spain.

20 Cyclists from 20 countries participated in the contest. Because of the number of entries, there were no qualification rounds for this discipline. Consequently, the event was run direct to the final.

Final
The Final and only race was run at 19:45 on March 31. The competition consisted on 40 laps, making a total of 10 km. Yumari González attacked off the front of the bunch within the final two laps of the race, securing her gold medal, Calle followed to claim the silver leaving the rest to fight for bronze in a bunch sprint. Rebecca Quinn sprinted between two riders to claim third position but was later relegated when the judges decided she had made contact with another rider in doing so.

References

Women's scratch
UCI Track Cycling World Championships – Women's scratch
UCI